"Right About Now" is a single by German disc jockey Mousse T. It was released as the final single released from his second studio album, All Nite Madness (2004), on 6 December 2004. The song peaked at number 28 on the UK Singles Chart, number 19 in Italy, and number six in Finland. In 2005, the song represented Lower Saxony in the Bundesvision Song Contest 2005, placing fourth with 85 points.

Charts

Weekly charts

Year-end charts

Release history

References

Mousse T. songs
2004 singles
2004 songs